Lucien Blondeau (1884–1965) was a French stage, television and film actor.

Selected filmography
 First on the Rope (1944)
 Girl with Grey Eyes (1945)
 Son of France (1946)
 Imperial Violets (1952)
 Crimson Curtain (1952)

References

Bibliography
 Goble, Alan. The Complete Index to Literary Sources in Film. Walter de Gruyter, 1999.

External links

1884 births
1965 deaths
French male stage actors
French male film actors
Male actors from Paris